Infrascale is a DRaaS (disaster-recovery-as-a-service) and data protection company based in El Segundo, California.

History 
Founded in 2011 by Ken Shaw, the company is headquartered in El Segundo, California, and has offices in Australia, India, and the Ukraine. It has 16 datacenters around the world including the United States, Canada, Australia, United Kingdom, India, Ukraine, and South Africa.

In 2014, the company acquired Eversync Solutions, Inc to offer cloud and on-premises backup, archiving, and disaster recovery solutions.

The program received awards from various analyst firms and publications. In 2017, Redmond Channel Partners named Infrascale the Best Ransomware Solution. Also in 2017, Gartner named Infrascale a Leader in the DRaaS Magic Quadrant. In 2016, Gartner named Infrascale a Visionary in the disaster recovery Magic Quadrant and in 2015, a business continuity Cool Vendor. CRN named Infrascale one of the "20 Coolest Cloud Storage Vendors of the 2016 Cloud 100".

Features 
Features include failover, continuous data protection, unlimited versioning, archiving, integrated local backup, remote wipe & geo-locate, and military-grade security. It is available as a direct-to-cloud offering or with a local, on-premises appliance.

On January 17, 2017, they announced a partnership with the Google Cloud Platform to deliver faster failover.

Product editions 
Infrascale comes in two versions:

 Cloud Backup- Direct-to-cloud backup for mobile, laptops, and remote offices without appliances.
 Disaster Recovery- Instantly run your systems in our cloud when they go down due to hardware failure or natural disaster. 
Infrascale is 100% channel focused and concentrates heavily on selling through IT resellers and managed service providers.

The Infrascale products include several features targeted at protecting data such as:
 Exchange Backup and Granular Recovery
 Windows Server Backup and Recovery
 Sharepoint Server Backup and Recovery
 SQL Server Backup and Recovery
 Linux Backup and Recovery
 Unix Backup and Recovery
 Novell NetWare Backup and Recovery
 Solaris Backup and Recovery

See also
 Ransomware Mitigation
 Malware Protection
 Off-site data protection
 Disaster recovery
 On-Demand Failover	
 Comparison of online backup services

References

External links
 

As a service
Cloud applications
Software industry